Henry Tidyman "Harry" Thompson (1 December 1871 – 25 February 1957) was an Australian rules footballer who played with St Kilda and Carlton in the Victorian Football League (VFL).

Despite not making his Carlton debut until Round 12, in 1899 he was Carlton's leading goal kicker for the season with 8 goals.

Notes

External links 

Harry Thompson's profile at Blueseum

1871 births
1957 deaths
Australian rules footballers from Victoria (Australia)
St Kilda Football Club players
Carlton Football Club players
People from Beechworth